Paul Nowak (March 14, 1914 – January 10, 1983) was an American basketball player.  He was a three-time All-American at Notre Dame and was an early professional in the National Basketball League.

Nowak, a center, played at South Bend Central High School and Notre Dame.  He played for Hall of Fame coach George Keogan and with fellow All-American teammate John Moir and future coaches Ray Meyer and George Ireland.  The squad went 22-2-1 in 1936 and was later named national champions by the Helms Athletic Foundation.

After his collegiate career, Nowak played professionally for the Akron Firestone Non-Skids with former Notre Dame teammate John Moir, leading the team to a National Basketball League title in 1940.  Nowak later played for the Toledo Jim Whites Chevrolets, Rochester Royals, and Philadelphia Sphas.

References

External links
 Indiana Basketball Hall of Fame profile

1914 births
1983 deaths
Akron Firestone Non-Skids players
All-American college men's basketball players
American men's basketball players
Basketball players from South Bend, Indiana
Centers (basketball)
Notre Dame Fighting Irish men's basketball players
People from Treasure Island, Florida
Philadelphia Sphas players
Rochester Royals players
Toledo Jim White Chevrolets players
20th-century American Jews